The Cal State Fullerton Titans softball program is a college softball team that represents the California State University, Fullerton in the Big West Conference in the National Collegiate Athletic Association. The team has had three head coaches since it started playing organized softball in the 1980 season.

Key

Coaches

Notes

References

Lists of college softball head coaches in the United States

Cal State Fullerton Titans softball coaches